The Tyumen Crown is a symbol found on the Nenets Autonomous Okrug and Yamalo-Nenets Autonomous Okrug flags.

Culture of Nenets Autonomous Okrug
Vexillology
Culture of Yamalo-Nenets Autonomous Okrug
Crowns in heraldry